Françoise Héritier (15 November 1933 – 15 November 2017) was a French anthropologist, ethnologist, and feminist. She was the successor of Claude Lévi-Strauss at the Collège de France (Chair of Comparative Studies of African Societies from 1982 to 1998, now emeritus professor). Her work dealt mainly with the theory of alliances and on the prohibition of incest (both theories based on the notion of exchange of women).  In addition to Lévi-Strauss, she was also influenced by Alfred Radcliffe-Brown. She was replaced by Philippe Descola, who is the current holder of the chair of anthropology at the Collège.

Biography 
Françoise Héritier came from Loire, in a social background that she described as a “small and reasonable bourgeoisie that came out of the peasantry”. She studied in Paris, in the Lycée Racine, and later in hypokhâgne in the lycée Fénelon. During a seminar given by Claude Lévi-Strauss at the Sorbonne University, where he talked about the “joking relationship in Fiji”, she had a “revelation” and decided to study ethnology. In 1957, she went on a mission in French Upper Volta (actual Burkina Faso) with the anthropologue Michel Izard, whom she would marry later.

Françoise Héritier was part of the structuralism movement. She is well known for her works in the theory of alliances and the prohibition of incest based on the notion of the circulation of women in the society. She brings the concepts of the “identical” and its “repulsive frustration”, in the continuity of the approaches of Claude Lévi-Strauss and Alfred Radcliffe-Brown. In her conception of the societies, she especially focuses on the concepts of “nature” and “environment”.

Like Claude Lévi-Strauss and his successor Philippe Descola, Françoise Héritier was first a study director at the EHESS, and was in 1982 elected at the Collège de France at the Chair of Anthropology (successor to Claude Lévi-Strauss). From 1998 to 2001, she was a member of the CNRS ethics committee.

In her book Masculin/Féminin, she noted that the distinction between the feminine and the masculine is universal and that exists everywhere; and that the male is always considered superior to the women. However, she showed in her book, Masculin/Féminin I et II, De la Violence, through numerous examples, the hierarchical thinking regarding men and women is a cultural construct—and therefore to be revisited. She called this concept "the differential valence of the sexes" (la valence différentielle des sexes) that she preferred to the concept of the masculine domination used by Pierre Bourdieu or Maurice Godelier.

She died the day of her birthday, 15 November 2017, in the Pitié-Salpêtrière Hospital in Paris. She was 84 years old.

Works 
Françoise Héritier, The Sweetness of Life, Penguin, 2014.
Françoise Héritier, Two Sisters and Their Mother: The Anthropology of Incest, MIT press, 2000
François Héritier, Masculin Féminin II: Dissoudre la hiérarchie, Odile Jacob, 2002 - paper edition
François Héritier, Masculin/Féminin: La pensée de la différence, Odile Jacob, 1996 - paper edition
François Héritier, Au gré des jours, Odile Jacob, 2017 - paper edition; Prix Femina 2017

References

1933 births
2017 deaths
Academic staff of the Collège de France
French anthropologists
French women anthropologists
Structuralists
French feminists
People from Loire (department)
Grand Cross of the Ordre national du Mérite
Grand Officiers of the Légion d'honneur